Ondina divisa is a species of sea snail, a marine gastropod mollusk in the family Pyramidellidae, the pyrams and their allies.

Description
The length of the shell measures 3 mm.

Distribution
This species occurs in the following locations:
 European waters (Iceland and from Norway to the Bay of Biscay)
 Belgian Exclusive Economic Zone
 British Isles
 Irish Exclusive economic Zone
 Mediterranean Sea

References

 van Aartsen J. J., 1987 : European Pyramidellidae: III. Odostomia and Ondina, Bollettino Malacologico 23 (1-4): 1-34

External links
 To Biodiversity Heritage Library (5 publications)
 To CLEMAM
 To Encyclopedia of Life
 To GenBank
 To Marine Species Identification Portal
 To World Register of Marine Species
 

Pyramidellidae
Gastropods described in 1797